Messidor is a 1979 French-Swiss drama film directed by Alain Tanner. It was entered into the 29th Berlin International Film Festival.

Cast
 Clémentine Amouroux as Jeanne Salève
 Catherine Rétoré as Marie Corrençon
 Franziskus Abgottspon
 Gerald Battiaz
 Hansjörg Bedschard
 René Besson
 Jürgen Brügger
 Walter Doppler
 Beat Fäh
 Michel Fidanza
 Claude Fleury
 Arthur Grosjean
 Max Heinzelmann

References

External links

1979 films
Swiss comedy-drama films
1970s French-language films
1979 drama films
Films directed by Alain Tanner
French female buddy films
Films set in Switzerland
1970s road comedy-drama films
1970s female buddy films
French road comedy-drama films
French-language Swiss films
1970s French films